The Piano is a 1993 erotic period drama film written and directed by Jane Campion. Starring Holly Hunter, Harvey Keitel, Sam Neill, and Anna Paquin in her first major acting role, the film focuses on a mute Scottish woman who travels to a remote part of New Zealand with her young daughter after her arranged marriage to a frontiersman.

A co-production between New Zealand, Australia and France, The Piano was a critical and commercial success, grossing US$140.2 million worldwide against its US$7 million budget. Hunter and Paquin both received high praise for their performances. In 1993, the film won the Palme d'Or at the Cannes Film Festival, making Jane Campion the first female director to ever receive this award. It won three Academy Awards out of eight total nominations in March 1994: Best Actress for Hunter, Best Supporting Actress for Paquin and Best Original Screenplay for Campion. Paquin was 11 years old at the time and remains the second-youngest actor to win an Oscar in a competitive category.

The plot has similarities to Jane Mander's 1920 novel "The Story of a New Zealand River", but also substantial differences. Campion says that Wuthering Heights and The African Queen were her inspirations.

Plot
In the mid-1800s, a Scotswoman named Ada McGrath who chooses not to speak is sold by her father into marriage with New Zealand frontiersman Alisdair Stewart, along with her daughter Flora. Ada has not spoken since the age of six, and the reason remains unknown. She communicates through playing the piano and sign language, with Flora acting as her interpreter. Ada had a relationship with a piano teacher whom she believed she had seduced through mental telepathy, resulting in Flora's birth, but the teacher left her after becoming frightened and refusing to listen.

Ada and Flora, along with their handcrafted piano, are stranded on a New Zealand beach by a ship's crew. The next day, Alisdair arrives with his Māori crew and neighbor George Baines, a retired sailor who's adapted to Maori customs, including facial tattoos. Alisdair initially tells Ada that they don't have enough bearers for the piano and then refuses to go back for it, claiming that they all need to make sacrifices. Ada is determined to be reunited with her piano, and coldly rejects Alisdair's advances. Desperate to retrieve her beloved piano, Ada seeks out George's help. Although he can't read her note, he is entranced by her music and agrees to help her. George offers Alisdair the land he's been coveting in exchange for the piano and Ada's lessons. Alisdair agrees, oblivious to George's attraction to Ada. Ada is enraged by George's proposition, but ultimately agrees to trade lessons for piano keys. She restricts the lessons to the black keys only and resists George's demands for more intimacy. Ada continues to rebuff Alisdair's advances while exploring her sensuality with George. George eventually realizes that Ada will never commit to him emotionally and returns the piano to her, acknowledging that their arrangement has made her a "whore" and him "wretched." George confesses that he wants Ada to care for him genuinely.

Although Ada has her piano back, she still longs for George and returns to him. Alisdair overhears them having sex and even watches them through a crack in the wall. Furious, he follows Ada the next day and confronts her in the forest, where he tries to force himself on her despite her strong resistance. Alisdair ultimately coerces Ada into promising she will no longer see George.

Shortly after, Ada instructs Flora to deliver a package to George, which contains a piano key with a love declaration engraved on it. Flora hesitates, but eventually delivers it to Alisdair instead. Enraged after reading the message, Alisdair cuts off Ada's index finger with an axe, depriving her of the ability to play the piano. He sends Flora to George with the severed finger, warning him to stay away from Ada. Later, while touching Ada as she sleeps, Alisdair hears what he thinks is her voice in his head, asking him to let George take her away. He goes to George's house and asks if Ada has ever spoken to him, but George assures him she has not. They leave together from the same beach where Ada first arrived in New Zealand, with her belongings and piano tied onto a Māori longboat. As they row to the ship, Ada asks George to throw the piano overboard. She gets entangled in the rope attached to the piano but eventually frees herself and is pulled to safety. 

In the epilogue, Ada describes her new life with George and Flora in Nelson, New Zealand, where she gives piano lessons in their new home. George has made her a metal finger to replace the one she lost, and Ada has been practicing and taking speech lessons. She sometimes dreams of the piano resting at the bottom of the ocean with her still tethered to it.

Cast

 Holly Hunter as Ada McGrath
 Harvey Keitel as George Baines
 Sam Neill as Alisdair Stewart
 Anna Paquin as Flora McGrath
 Kerry Walker as Aunt Morag
 Genevieve Lemon as Nessie
 Tungia Baker as Hira
 Ian Mune as Reverend
 Peter Dennett as Head seaman
 Cliff Curtis as Mana
 George Boyle as Ada's father
 Rose McIver as Angel
 Mika Haka as Tahu

Production
Casting the role of Ada was a difficult process. Sigourney Weaver was Campion's first choice, but ultimately turned down the role. Jennifer Jason Leigh was also considered, but had a conflict with her commitment to Rush (1991). Isabelle Huppert met with Jane Campion and had vintage period-style photographs taken of her as Ada, and later said she regretted not fighting for the role as Hunter did.

The casting for Flora occurred after Hunter had been selected for the part. They did a series of open auditions for girls age 9 to 13, focusing on girls who were small enough to be believable as Ada's daughter (as Holly Hunter is relatively short at 157 cm / 5' 2" tall). Anna Paquin ended up winning the role of Flora over 5,000 other girls.

Alistair Fox has argued that The Piano was significantly influenced by Jane Mander's The Story of a New Zealand River. Robert Macklin, an associate editor with The Canberra Times newspaper, has also written about the similarities. The film also serves as a retelling of the fairytale "Bluebeard", itself depicted as a scene in the Christmas pageant.

In July 2013, Campion revealed that she originally intended for the main character to drown in the sea after going overboard after her piano.

Production on the film started in April 1992, filming began on 11 May 1992 and lasted until July 1992, and production officially ended on 22 December 1992.

Reception
Reviews for the film were overwhelmingly positive. Roger Ebert wrote: "The Piano is as peculiar and haunting as any film I've seen" and "it is one of those rare movies that is not just about a story, or some characters, but about a whole universe of feeling". Hal Hinson of The Washington Post called it an "evocative, powerful, extraordinarily beautiful film".

The Piano was named one of the best films of 1993 by 86 film critics, making it the most acclaimed film of 1993.

In his 2013 Movie Guide, Leonard Maltin gave the film 3 1/2 stars out of 4, calling the film a "haunting, unpredictable tale of love and sex told from a woman's point of view" and went on to say "writer-director Campion has fashioned a highly original fable, showing the tragedy and triumph erotic passion can bring to one's daily life".

On review aggregator website Rotten Tomatoes, the film holds an approval rating of 90% based on 71 reviews, and an average rating of 8.50/10. The website's critical consensus reads: "Powered by Holly Hunter's main performance, The Piano is a truth-seeking romance played in the key of erotic passion." On Metacritic, the film has a weighted average score of 89 out of 100, based on 20 critics, indicating "universal acclaim".

The film was the highest-grossing New Zealand film of all-time surpassing Footrot Flats: The Dog's Tale (1986) with a gross of $NZ3.8 million.

Accolades
The film was nominated for eight Academy Awards (including Best Picture), winning three for Best Actress (Holly Hunter), Best Supporting Actress (Anna Paquin) and Best Original Screenplay (Jane Campion). At age 11, Anna Paquin became the second youngest competitive Academy Award winner (after Tatum O'Neal in 1973).

At the Cannes Film Festival, the film won the Palme d'Or (sharing with Chen Kaige's Farewell My Concubine), with Campion becoming the first woman to win the honour, as well as the first filmmaker from New Zealand to achieve this. Holly Hunter also won Best Actress.

In 2019, the BBC polled 368 film experts from 84 countries to name the 100 best films by women directors, and The Piano was named the top film, with nearly 10% of the critics polled giving it first place on their ballots.

Soundtrack

The score for the film was written by Michael Nyman, and included the acclaimed piece "The Heart Asks Pleasure First"; additional pieces were "Big My Secret", "The Mood That Passes Through You", "Silver Fingered Fling", "Deep Sleep Playing" and "The Attraction of the Pedalling Ankle". This album is rated in the top 100 soundtrack albums of all time and Nyman's work is regarded as a key voice in the film, which has a mute lead character.

Home media
The film was released on DVD in 1997 by LIVE Entertainment and on Blu-ray on 31 January 2012 by Lionsgate, but already released in 2010 in Australia.

On 11 August 2021, the Criterion Collection announced their first 4K Ultra HD releases, a six-film slate, will include The Piano. Criterion indicated each title will be available in a 4K UHD+Blu-ray combo pack, including a 4K UHD disc of the feature film as well as the film and special features on the companion Blu-ray. The Piano was released on January 25, 2022.

Literature
Althofer, Beth. "The Piano, or Wuthering Heights revisited, or separation and civilization through the eyes of the (girl) child." Psychoanalytic Review 81, no. 2 (1994): 339-342.
Attwood, Feona. "Weird Lullaby Jane Campion's The Piano." Feminist Review 58, no. 1 (1998): 85-101.
Bentley, Greg. "Mothers, daughters, and (absent) fathers in Jane Campion's The Piano." Literature/Film Quarterly 30, no. 1 (2002): 46.
Bihlmeyer, Jaime. "The (Un) Speakable FEMININITY in Mainstream Movies: Jane Campion's" The Piano"." Cinema Journal (2005): 68-88.
Bihlmeyer, Jaime. "Jane Campion’s The Piano: The Female Gaze, the Speculum and the Chora within the H (y) st (e) rical Film." Essays in Philosophy 4, no. 1 (2003): 3-27.
Bogdan, Deanne, Hilary E. Davis, and Judith Robertson. "Sweet Surrender and Trespassing Desires in Reading: Jane Campion's The Piano and the struggle for responsible pedagogy." Changing English 4, no. 1 (1997): 81-103.
Bussi, Elisa. "Voyages and Border Crossings: Jane Campion’s The Piano (1993)." In The Seeing Century, pp. 161–173. Brill, 2000.
Campion, Jane. Jane Campion's The Piano. United Kingdom: Cambridge University Press, 2000.
Chumo II, Peter N. "Keys to the Imagination: Jane Campion's The Piano." Literature/Film Quarterly 25, no. 3 (1997): 173.
Dalton, Mary M., and Kirsten James Fatzinger. "Choosing silence: defiance and resistance without voice in Jane Campion's The Piano." Women and Language 26, no. 2 (2003): 34.
Davis, Michael. "Tied to that Maternal ‘Thing’: Death and Desire in Jane Campion's The Piano." Gothic Studies 4, no. 1 (2002): 63-78.
Dayal, Samir. "Inhuman love: Jane Campion's The Piano." Postmodern Culture 12, no. 2 (2002).
DuPuis, Reshela. "Romanticizing Colonialism: Power and Pleasure in Jane Campion's" The Piano"." The Contemporary Pacific (1996): 51-79.
Jacobs, Carol. “Playing Jane Campion’s Piano: Politically,” in Modern Language Notes, vol. 109, December 1994, pp. 757–785.
Frankenberg, Ronnie. "Campion's The Piano'." The Body, Childhood and Society (2016): 125.
Frus, Phyllis. "Borrowing a melody: Jane Campion’s ‘The Piano’and intertextuality." Beyond adaptation: Essays on radical transformations of original works (2010).
Gillett, Sue. "Lips and fingers: Jane Campion's The Piano." (1995): 277-287.
Hazel, Valerie. "Disjointed Articulations: The Politics of Voice and Jane Campion's" The Piano"." Women's Studies Journal 10, no. 2 (1994): 27.
Hendershot, Cyndy. "(Re) Visioning the Gothic: Jane Campion's" The Piano"." Literature/Film Quarterly 26, no. 2 (1998): 97-108.
Izod, John. "The Piano, the animus, and the colonial experience." Journal of Analytical Psychology 41, no. 1 (1996): 117-136.
James, Caryn. "A Distinctive Shade of Dark.‖ Jane Campion’s The Piano. Harriet Margolis, ed." (2000): 174-176.
Jayamanne, Laleen. "Post-colonial gothic: the narcissistic wound of Jane Campion’s The Piano’." Toward Cinema and Its Double: Cross-cultural Mimesis: 24-48.
Jolly, Margaret. "LOOKING BACK? Gender, Sexuality and Race in The Piano." Australian Feminist Studies 24, no. 59 (2009): 99-121.
Klinger, Barbara. "Contested Endings: Interpreting The Piano’s (1993) Final Scenes." Film Moments: Criticism, History, Theory (2010): 135-39.
Klinger, Barbara. "The art film, affect and the female viewer: The Piano revisited." Screen 47, no. 1 (2006): 19-41.
Molina, Caroline. "Muteness and mutilation: the aesthetics of disability in Jane Campion’s The Piano." The Body and Physical Difference: Discourses of Disability (1997): 267-282.
Najita, Susan Yukie. "Family Resemblances: The Construction of Pakeha History in Jane Campion's" The Piano"." ARIEL: A Review of International English Literature 32, no. 1 (2001).
Norgrove, Aaron. "But is it music? The crisis of identity in The Piano." Race & class 40, no. 1 (1998): 47-56.
Pflueger, Pennie. "The Piano and Female Subjectivity: Kate Chopin’s The Awakening (1899) and Jane Campion’s The Piano (1993)." Women's Studies 44, no. 4 (2015): 468-498.
Preis-Smith, Agata. "Was Ada McGrath a Cyborg, or, the Post-human Concept of the Female Artist in Jane Campion’s The Piano." Acta philologica (2009): 21.
Reid, Mark A. "A few black keys and Maori tattoos: Re‐reading Jane Campion's the piano in PostNegritude time." Quarterly Review of Film & Video 17, no. 2 (2000): 107-116.
Riu, Carmen Pérez. "TWO GOTHIC FEMINIST TEXTS: EMILY BRONTË'S" WUTHERING HEIGHTS" AND THE FILM," THE PIANO", BY JANE CAMPION." Atlantis (2000): 163-173.
Sklarew, Bruce H. "I have not spoken: silence in The Piano." In Psychoanalysis and Film, pp. 115–120. Routledge, 2018.
Taylor, Lib. "Inscription in The Piano." In Writing and Cinema, pp. 88–101. Routledge, 2014.
Thornley, Davinia. "Duel or Duet? Gendered Nationalism in" The Piano"." Film Criticism 24, no. 3 (2000): 61-76.
Williams, Donald. "The Piano: The Isolated, Constricted Self." Film Commentaries, CG Jung Page. Internet address (2013).
Wrye, Harriet Kimble. "Tuning a clinical ear to the ambiguous chords of Jane Campion's The Piano." Psychoanalytic Inquiry 18, no. 2 (1998): 168-182.
Zarzosa, Agustin. "Jane Campion's The Piano: melodrama as mode of exchange." New Review of Film and Television Studies 8, no. 4 (2010): 396-411.

Footnotes

References

External links

 
 
 
 
 
 Roger Ebert's review 
 The Piano at Ozmovies

1993 films
1993 romantic drama films
Adultery in films
Australian romantic drama films
French romantic drama films
New Zealand romantic drama films
Māori-language films
British Sign Language films
Fictional elective mutes
Films directed by Jane Campion
Best Foreign Film César Award winners
1990s feminist films
Films about disability
Films featuring a Best Actress Academy Award-winning performance
Films featuring a Best Drama Actress Golden Globe-winning performance
Films featuring a Best Supporting Actress Academy Award-winning performance
Films set in New Zealand
Films set in the 1850s
Films set in the British Empire
Films about pianos and pianists
Films set on beaches
Films shot in New Zealand
Films whose writer won the Best Original Screenplay Academy Award
1990s historical romance films
New Zealand independent films
BAFTA winners (films)
Independent Spirit Award for Best Foreign Film winners
Best Foreign Film Guldbagge Award winners
Palme d'Or winners
Romantic period films
Ciby 2000 films
Australian historical romance films
New Zealand historical romance films
Australian independent films
French historical romance films
French independent films
Films scored by Michael Nyman
Films about Māori people
Films about mother–daughter relationships
Films about sexual repression
1990s English-language films
1990s French films
1990s New Zealand films